Padbruggea is a genus of flowering plants in the family Fabaceae. Its native range stretches from southern China to western Malesia.

Description
Their stems are dark green becoming brown with age. Their leaves are evergreen and generally have 8–18 paired leaflets plus a terminal leaflet. Nine of the stamens are fused together, the other is free; all curve upwards at the apex.

Taxonomy

The genus Padbruggea was established by Friedrich Miquel in 1855. The genus name is in honour of Robbert Padbrugge (or Padtbrugge) (1638–1703), a Dutch doctor in the service of the Dutch East India Company. He was governor of Ambon from 1682 to 1687. A 2019 molecular phylogenetic study placed the genus in an expanded tribe Wisterieae, in a clade with Austrocallerya and, more distantly, Wisteria. The shape of the seed pods is one feature distinguishing Padbruggea from Austrocallerya. Padbruggea has seed pods that are oblong or obovoid and coarsely ridged; those of Austrocallerya are spindle-shaped and finely ridged or grooved, with constrictions between the seeds (torulose).

Species
According to Kew:
Padbruggea dasyphylla 
Padbruggea filipes 
Padbruggea maingayi

Distribution
Padbruggea species are native from south-central and southeast mainland China, through Indo-China (Laos, Malaya, Myanmar, Thailand and Vietnam) to Sumatra and Java.

References

Fabaceae genera
Wisterieae